Qermez Khalifeh-ye Olya (also Romanized as Qermez Khalīfeh-ye ‘Olyā) is a village in Zarrineh Rud Rural District, in the Central District of Miandoab County, West Azerbaijan Province, Iran. At the 2006 census, its population was 539, in 152 families.

References 

Populated places in Miandoab County